Elections were held in Illinois on Tuesday, November 3, 1992.

Primary elections were held on March 17.

Election information

Turnout
For the primaries, turnout was 43.68%, with 2,561,882 ballots cast (with 1,663,422 Democratic ballots, 878,438 Republican ballots, and 49,672 nonpartisan ballots cast).

For the general election, turnout was 78.24%, with 5,164,357 ballots cast.

Straight-ticket voting
Illinois had a straight-ticket voting option in 1992.

Federal elections

United States President

Illinois voted for Democratic ticket of Bill Clinton and Al Gore.

This represented a realigning election for Illinois in regards to presidential politics. This was the first time since 1964 that Illinois voted for the Democratic ticket in a presidential election. This ended a streak of six consecutive elections in which the state had voted for the Republican ticket. It also began a streak that, as of the 2016 election, continues, in which the state has voted for the Democratic ticket in seven consecutive presidential elections.

United States Senate

Incumbent Democrat Alan J. Dixon was unseated, losing the Democratic primary to Carol Moseley Braun. Braun defeated Republican nominee Richard S. Williamson in the general election, becoming the first female African-American senator in United States history, as well as the first African-American elected to the United States Senate as a Democrat, and the first female senator elected from Illinois.

United States House

Illinois had lost two congressional seats in the reapportionment following the 1990 United States Census. All 20 of Illinois’ remaining seats in the United States House of Representatives were up for election in 1992.

Before the election, Democrats held fifteen seats from Illinois, while Republicans held seven. In 1992, Democrats won twelve seats while Republicans won eight.

State elections

State Senate
As this was the first election following a redistricting, all of the seats of the Illinois Senate were up for election in 1992. Republicans flipped control of the Illinois Senate.

State House of Representatives
All of the seats in the Illinois House of Representatives were up for election in 1992. Democrats retained control of the Illinois House of Representatives.

Trustees of the University of Illinois

An election was held for three of nine seats for Trustees of University of Illinois system for six-year terms. 

The election saw the reelection of incumbent Democrat Judith Calder to a second, as well as the election of new trustees, Democrats Jeff Gindorf and Ada Lopez.

Incumbent Republican Dave Downey, who had been appointed in 1991, lost reelection. Third-term incumbent Democrat Nina T. Shepherd was not nominated for reelection.

Judicial elections
Judicial elections were held.

Ballot measures
Illinois voters voted on a two ballot measures in 1992.

Two of the measures were legislatively referred constitutional amendments. In order to be approved, the legislatively referred constitutional amendments required either 60% support among those specifically voting on the amendment or 50% support among all ballots cast in the elections.

Crime Victim Rights Amendment

Voters approved the Crime Victim Rights Amendment (also known as "Amendment 1", a legislatively referred constitutional amendment which added Article I, Section 8.1 to the Constitution of Illinois. This guarantees crime victims certain rights, including the right to receive information about cases in which they are involved.

Education Equality Amendment 
The Education Equality Amendment (also known as "Amendment 2"), a legislatively referred constitutional amendment which would have amended of Article X, Section 1 of the Constitution of Illinois to mandate for equal opportunity in education, failed to meet either threshold to amend the constitution.

Advisory referendums

Unfunded Mandates on Local Government referendum
An advisory referendum on unfunded mandates on local government was supported by voters.

Local elections
Local elections were held. These included county elections, such as the Cook County elections.

References

 
Illinois